= Dedengita =

Military training camp in Sudan

Dedengita is a place within Darfur in Sudan. It is a military training camp. Another military training camp in the area is at Guedera. It is about 25 km from the village of Meramta.
