= Guedera =

Guedera is a place within Darfur in Sudan. It is a military training camp. Another military training camp in the area is at Dedengita. It is about 25 kilometres (16 mi) from the village of Meramta.
